Jim Ned Creek is a river in Texas. The stream rises outside of Tuscola and flows southeast for approximately 70 miles to Pecan Bayou at Lake Brownwood. Jim Need Creek was dammed in 1966 to form Lake Coleman.

The stream has two tributaries: East Jim Ned Creek in southeastern Taylor County and South Fork of Jim Ned Creek in northwestern Coleman County.

See also
List of rivers of Texas

References

USGS Geographic Names Information Service
USGS Hydrologic Unit Map - State of Texas (1974)

Rivers of Texas